Laccocera is a genus of delphacid planthoppers in the family Delphacidae. There are about 10 described species in Laccocera.

Species
These 10 species belong to the genus Laccocera:
 Laccocera bicornata Crawford, 1914
 Laccocera canadensis Beirne, 1950
 Laccocera flava Crawford, 1914
 Laccocera lineata Scudder, 1963
 Laccocera minuta Penner, 1945
 Laccocera obesa Van Duzee, 1897
 Laccocera oregonensis Penner, 1945
 Laccocera vanduzeei Penner, 1945
 Laccocera vittipennis Van Duzee, 1897
 Laccocera zonata (Van Duzee, 1897)

References

Further reading

 
 
 
 

Articles created by Qbugbot
Auchenorrhyncha genera
Delphacinae